Dominique Lashawn Clark (born March 15, 1991), better known by her stage name Dominique Young Unique, is an American rapper and model. In 2012, Clark signed to Sony Records, a contract which ended in 2014. Dominique is currently signed to The Hana Road Music group.

Career

Early beginnings
As a model, Clarks' debut experience on the runway was in 2011, for London-based fashion designer Katie Eary. She also appeared in Vogue's September 2012 issue, alongside fellow models Tali Lennox and Cara Delevingne.

2009–present: Breakthrough
Clark first gained recognition in 2009, when she released her debut EP Hot Girl, followed by her promotional video for ‘War Talk’, a song taken from her debut mixtape Domination, released in 2010. She has since released two more mixtapes, Glamorous Touch and Stupid Pretty, both in 2011, alongside various promotional videos, and collaborations with Mad Decent-signed producer Branko, A.N.D.Y., and most recently, a feature on "Earthquake", a collaboration between DJ Fresh and Diplo, released by Ministry of Sound.

Clark's debut performance of "Earthquake" occurred during DJ Fresh's set at the New York leg of the international Electric Daisy Carnival festival. Clark and DJ Fresh performed "Earthquake" again at Radio 1's Big Weekend, during the latter's headlining set on the "1Xtra Arena/In New Music We Trust Stage". Additionally, an edited version of "Earthquake" was included on the Kick-Ass 2 soundtrack under the name "Motherquake".

In February 2014 Clark featured on Le Youth's single "Dance with Me" which reached 11 on the official UK singles chart. Her debut single, "Throw It Down", was released on April 20, 2014.

She is the featured artist on Don Diablo's May 2016 single "Drifter".

Discography

EPs

Mixtapes

Singles

As lead artist

As featured artist

Notes

References

1991 births
African-American women rappers
Living people
Musicians from Tampa, Florida
21st-century American rappers
21st-century American women musicians
21st-century African-American women
21st-century African-American musicians
Sony Music artists
Rappers from Florida
21st-century women rappers